Cal is a 1984 Irish drama film directed by Pat O'Connor and starring John Lynch and Helen Mirren. Based on the novella Cal written by Bernard MacLaverty who also wrote the script, the film was entered into the 1984 Cannes Film Festival, where Mirren won the award for Best Actress.

Plot
Cal (John Lynch) is a young member of the Provisional Irish Republican Army (IRA) in 1970s Northern Ireland. He acts as a driver on a nighttime murder of a member of the Royal Ulster Constabulary (RUC), which takes place at the victim's home in view of his father, who is also shot.

One year later, Cal learns that a librarian, Marcella (Helen Mirren), to whom he is attracted, is a Catholic and the widow of the victim. Cal wants to leave the IRA, but is pressured to remain. He and his father live in the city, where they feel threatened by Orange Order marches and are harassed by Loyalist gangs. Cal is offered work in Marcella's Protestant husband's family farm, where she lives. Initially he works as a hand and, after he and his father are burned out, moves to a semi-derelict cottage on the farm, without telling the IRA his new location.

Marcella is unhappy, feeling suffocated by her domineering mother-in-law and sick father-in-law. Marcella confesses that her marriage was not a happy one. Over time, Cal and Marcella begin a love affair—with Marcella unaware of Cal's role in her husband's death.

While Christmas shopping for Marcella and her child, he is abducted by the IRA, who are unwilling for him to leave them. The car is stopped at a British Army checkpoint and tries to get away. In the ensuing crash, Cal escapes and makes his way to Marcella's home, where he declares his love for her and hints at his involvement in her husband's murder. He has been pursued to the house by the RUC and is arrested and taken away.

Most of the movie was filmed in Drogheda in locations around the town, including Barrack Street and St. Finian's Park.

Cast
 Helen Mirren as Marcella
 John Lynch as Cal
 Donal McCann as Shamie
 Ray McAnally as Cyril Dunlop
 John Kavanagh as Skeffington
 Stevan Rimkus as Crilly
 Catherine Gibson as Mrs Morton
 Louis Rolston as Dermot Ryan
 Tom Hickey as Preacher
 Gerard Mannix Flynn as Arty
 Seamus Forde as Mr Morton
 Edward Byrne as Skeffington Sr
 J. J. Murphy as Man in Library
 Audrey Johnson as Luc
 Brian Munn as Robert Morton

Reception
As of 16 March 2011, the aggregate review website Rotten Tomatoes has recorded 91% positive response based on 11 reviews.

Goldcrest Films invested £396,000 in the film and received £278,000 in return. They lost £118,000.

See also
 Cal (soundtrack)

References

External links 
 
 
 Movie trailer

1984 films
1984 romantic drama films
English-language Irish films
Films about the Irish Republican Army
Films based on Irish novels
1980s political drama films
Films about The Troubles (Northern Ireland)
Films directed by Pat O'Connor
Films set in Belfast
Films produced by David Puttnam
Irish romantic drama films
Films shot at EMI-Elstree Studios
1980s English-language films